Buli Tsho is a natural lake and pilgrimage place located in the heart of a thick forest at a place called Baer-pang in Zhemgang District of Bhutan.

Area
The surface area of the Buli Tsho is 2 ha and situated at an altitude of 1372 m from sea level.

Cultural significance
Tshomen Kuntu Zangmo commonly known as Buli Menmo is believed to be the deity of the Buli Tsho Lake; believed to be half lady and lower half snake.

References

Lakes of Bhutan
Zhemgang District